The First Class were a British pop music studio-based group, put together by songwriter and record producer John Carter. They are best known for their hit song "Beach Baby," a top 20 hit in both the US and UK.

Career
The First Class was the studio creation of British singer/songwriter John Carter, who hired singers Tony Burrows and Chas Mills to join him as an outlet for material Carter wrote, with his creative partner and wife, Gillian (Jill) Shakespeare. In the 1960s, Carter had formed the group Carter-Lewis and the Southerners with fellow producer Ken Lewis. That band dissolved when Carter and Lewis began working extensively as studio singers, appearing on the hits "It's Not Unusual" (Tom Jones), "I Can't Explain" (The Who), "Hi Ho Silver Lining" (Jeff Beck), "(There's) Always Something There to Remind Me" (Sandie Shaw), "Excerpt From A Teenage Opera" (Keith West), and "Out of Time" (Chris Farlowe). Concurrently with this session work, Carter was a member of The Ivy League, leaving in 1966 to be replaced by Burrows.

Carter and Shakespeare wrote the song "Beach Baby". Carter immediately created a studio band, enlisting musicians Burrows and Mills, to record the song for Jonathan King's UK Records record label – under the name The First Class. In 1974, the song became a hit in the UK (where it peaked at #13), and in the US, where it peaked at #4.

The group recorded a follow-up single, "Bobby Dazzler", and material for their eponymous first album, The First Class. While there was some demand for live performances by the group, neither Carter nor Burrows had the time for or interest in touring, so a group including bassist Robin Shaw, lead singer Del John, guitarist Spencer James (since 1986 lead singer with The Searchers), keyboardist Clive Barrett and drummer Eddie Richards (like Burrows, a former member of Edison Lighthouse) was assembled to perform a number of dates as The First Class. Although that quintet was pictured and credited along with Carter, Burrows and Mills on the cover of the band's first album, none of the "live" quintet actually performed on "Beach Baby" or any of the album's other tracks.

"Bobby Dazzler" and later singles "Dreams Are Ten a Penny" No. 83. US, "Won't Somebody Help Me" and "Funny How Love Can Be" (No. 74 US, a remake of the 1965 hit by The Ivy League, on which Carter had been one of the vocalists) failed to chart in the UK. Officially now down to a trio (Burrows, Carter and Mills) supported by studio session players, the group released an unsuccessful second album (SST) in 1976.

After the issue of the second album, The First Class became strictly an occasional studio venture, while various members pursued other work.  Still, the band continued to record and release non-album singles over the next several years, for a variety of labels:  "Broken Toy" (1978), "Song On The Wind" (1979), "Ocean of Glass" (1981) and "Gimme Little Sign" (1983). None of these singles charted or received much attention, and by the mid-1980s the First Class effectively ceased to exist.

Chas Mills subsequently retired from the music industry to run a restaurant in North London. Tony Burrows went on to become known as the only artist to score five hit tunes with five different groups, the artist known as "A one-hit wonder . . . five times."  Burrows was also lead singer on the song "Love Grows (Where My Rosemary Goes)" with Edison Lighthouse and on White Plains' hit "My Baby Loves Lovin'" with his frequent collaborator Roger Greenaway. Burrows sang lead male vocals on the hit by Brotherhood of Man, "United We Stand," also with Greenaway. Burrows and Greenaway were also paired in their early years as The Pipkins, with a top hit song called "Gimme Dat Ding". The two individually continued on to numerous successful ventures and occasionally perform together reviving their former hit songs. John Carter remained active writing jingles and managing his back catalogue. He later reflected on The First Class: "Making the First Class albums was a very happy and creative time. Who knows if we ever come up with another suitable song, maybe we will all get back together one day and record under that name again?"

Discography

Original albums
September 1974 The First Class UK Records. UKAL R 1008.
October 1976 The First Class SST UK Records. UKAL 1022.

Compilation CDs
1993 Beach Baby & Other Assorted Love Songs (Century Records, Japan)
1994 Golden Classics (Collectables Records, US)
1996 The First Class/The First Class SST (compilation of 2 LPs) (See For Miles Records, UK)
1999 Beach Baby: The Very Best of The First Class (Collectables Records, US)
2005 Summer Sound Sensations (RPM Records, UK)
2023 Beach Baby: The Complete Recordings (Cherry Red Records, UK)

Singles

See also
List of 1970s one-hit wonders in the United States
List of performers on Top of the Pops

References

External links
Discography
45cat discography

English pop music groups